Monrovia High School is a public high school located in Monrovia, California, a northeastern suburb of Los Angeles, United States. Monrovia High School is the only grades 9–12 comprehensive high school in the Monrovia Unified School District. Established in 1893, the campus is located in an environment of neo-Spanish architecture, green lawns, hundred-year-old oak trees, and is nestled against the San Gabriel Mountains.  The portion of the campus designed in 1928 is the work of noted Los Angeles architect John C. Austin.

In 2006, the citizens of Monrovia approved a $45 million bond for the high school. Major construction transformed the campus by adding a science building with technology labs, a gymnasium to support the physical education and sports programs, a stadium and bleachers, an overall renovation of the campus. The construction was completed in 2012.

Academic Programs
Advanced Placement 
AVID
CTE PAthways 
Digital Studies Academy (DSA)
Early College (Partnered with Citrus College) 
Humanities Academy 
Math and Science Academy (MASA) 
Music
Modern Languages (French, Mandarin, Spanish) 
Special Education
Student Leadership (ASB and Renaissance) 
Theatre Arts

Athletics
Beach Volleyball (Boys and Girls) 
Baseball (Boys)
Basketball (Boys and Girls)
Cheer (Coed)
Cross Country (Boys and Girls)
Football (Boys) 
Golf (Coed)
Soccer (Boys and Girls)
Softball (Girls)
Swimming (Coed)
Tennis (Boys and Girls) 
Track (Boys and Girls)
Volleyball (Boys and Girls) 
Water Polo (Boys and Girls)  
Wrestling (Boys and Girls)

Music
Monrovia High School has a Southern California School Band and Orchestra Association division 1A band (the Marching Wildcats), an indoor drum line, a color guard, a jazz band, an orchestra, and a choir.

Events
On October 23, 1946, the high school was the site of the fourth debate between incumbent Congressman Jerry Voorhis and his challenger, future president Richard Nixon.

In 1971, George Trapp, an alumnus of the Monrovia high school was the first-round draft pick of the Atlanta Hawks.

In 1993, Corie Blount, another alumnus of the school, was the first round draft pick of the Chicago Bulls.

On July 22, 1996, then-President Bill Clinton visited Monrovia High School and made a speech.

The school has also been the site of movie shoots including Not Another Teen Movie, A Cinderella Story,  Liar Liar, Leave it to Beaver, and Drive Me Crazy.  MHS was also the filming site of 976-EVIL.

Competes in the Rio Hondo League in all sports.

The varsity football team won the CIF-Southern Section championship in its 10th try, defeating Whittier Christian High of La Habra by a score of 38–8 on December 11, 2010. The game was played at Arcadia High School with Monrovia High as the home team. Head Coach Ryan Maddox was named the Pasadena Star-News football coach of the year. Quarterback Nick Bueno, a senior graduating in 2011, won the Rio Hondo League's Most Valuable Player award and was the Pasadena Star-News player of the year for 2010.

The varsity football team won the CIF-Southern Section championship again in 2011, defeating San Gabriel High School (Alhambra Unified School District) on December 10, 2011 by the score of 53–14, at Monrovia High School, giving head coach Ryan Maddox a second championship in a row.

The varsity football team won the CIF-Southern Section championship for the third time in a row in 2012, beating Paraclete High School of Lancaster by the score of 23–7 on November 30, 2012, at Monrovia High School, giving head coach Ryan Maddox a third championship in a row.

Notable alumni

George Trapp, NBA power forward / Center 
Corie Blount, NBA power forward
Hardiman Cureton, football player
Lois Gaston, first African-American mayor of Duarte, California
Damon Griffin, NFL wide receiver
Chris Hale, NFL defensive back
Kiyoshi Kuromiya, Human Rights Activist
Damien Lawson, Awaken the Empire Singer/Songwriter
Keith Lincoln, AFL running back
Johnny Lindell, MLB baseball player
Thomas J. Sargent, 2011 Nobel Prize Winner in Economics
Leslie Van Houten, member of the Manson Family
Roy Zimmerman, NFL quarterback

References

External links

 Monrovia High School
 Monrovia Unified School District home page
 Monrovia High School Band and Colorguard

High schools in Los Angeles County, California
Public high schools in California
Monrovia, California
1946 establishments in California